Dallwitz is a German surname. Notable people with the surname include:

 Burkhard Dallwitz (born 1959), German composer
 Dave Dallwitz (1914–2003), Australian musician, painter and art teacher
 Johann von Dallwitz (1855-1919), German politician

 Dallwitz, the German name for Dalovice (Karlovy Vary District), a village in Karlovy Vary District, Czech Republic

German-language surnames
de:Dallwitz